Indian Institute of Packaging (IIP) an autonomous body which was set up by the packaging and allied industries and the Ministry of Commerce, Government of India in 1966 under Societies Registration Act,1860 with the specific objective of improving the packaging standards and excellency in the country.

It offers a two-year postgraduate diploma in packaging at Mumbai, Delhi, Hyderabad and Kolkata. Testing and packaging facilities are at Ahmedabad and Chennai. It also offers packaging testing facilities, laboratories and consultation for packaging development and improvement.

Admission
Indian Institute of Packaging conducts the All India Common Entrance Test (IIP-CET) and personal interview every year for the admission process.

Campus
 New Delhi 
 Mumbai
 Kolkata
 Chennai
 Hyderabad
 Ahmedabad

Courses
 two-year full time post graduate diploma course in packaging (pgdp) in Mumbai Campus and kolkata campus.
 three-month full time certificate course in packaging (itc).
 18-month correspondence course in packaging (dpc) and many short term certificate courses in Chennai Campus.
 Master's in packaging (in collaboration with JNTUH) Hyderabad Campus.

 Master of science in packaging (affiliation with GGSIPU) in Delhi Campus.

References

Packaging
Higher education in India